Robert Sigl (born 11 July 1962) is a German film director and writer. He attended the University of Television and Film Munich from 1981-1986. His short film "The Christmas Tree" was shown at international festivals in Madrid and Berlin. In 1987 he started preparations for his first full-length motion picture Laurin in Hungary which he also scripted.

Laurin was awarded the Bavarian Film Awards for best direction of a newcomer. At the age of 25, Sigl was the youngest director ever to receive this distinction. Laurin was shown at numerous international festivals, including Moscow and Málaga, and was released in Great Britain by the U.K. video label “Eureka Entertainment” and in Spain by Filmax. It is currently airing on Canada's Scream TV and is available in the U.S. on an import DVD from Luminous Film and Video.

In the ensuing years Sigl worked on several projects and screenplays before moving on to shoot the acclaimed and sophisticated miniseries Stella Stellaris in Poland, a fairy-tale-like fantasy/comedy/adventure. He directed the episode "The Lost Daughter" for the extremely popular action series Alarm for Cobra 11 - Die Autobahnpolizei.

Both Laurin and Stella Stellaris left a deep impression with Canadian producer Paul Donovan and the executives of U.S. Cable Channel Showtime and Robert Sigl was commissioned to direct one of the four pilot movies – Giga Shadow for the international Science-Fiction-Miniseries Lexx. Giga Shadow featured Malcolm McDowell and a spectacular amount of breathtaking computer generated effects. Lexx was sold into more than one hundred countries. For the third season Sigl returned to direct the episode "K-Town".

He directed the German horror-thriller  which became one of the most successful TV movies of 1999; it was subsequently released in the USA on DVD and Home Video by Fangoria/MTI. Due to its immense success Sigl was commissioned to direct the sequel The Island of Fear aka: Dead Island - School's Out II (U.S. title) in Brittany.

Sigl helmed several episodes of the German crime series Der Ermittler and Tatort. He is currently working on other new projects for the big screen, among them The Spider, Medusa, The Blind Room, A Study in Red Trilogy, DragonMan: The Adventures of Luke Starr, Jack the Ripper: Reality and Myth (TV Movie), The Blind Room, Wurdilak, and The 13th Disciple.

References

External links

German mass media people
1962 births
Living people